Towncraft can refer to:
Towncraft (film), a 2007 documentary
Towncraft (album), a 1992 compilation
 TownCraft (video game), a 2013 video game.
 Towncraft Agrico, a 2016 Agriculture and Sustainability Company.
 Towncraft Technologies, a 2016 IT Company.